A cachito is a Venezuelan ham filled croissant.

Cachito may also refer to:

"Cachito" (Nat King Cole song), 1958
"Cachito" (Maná song), 2000
"Dame un cachito pa' huelé", 1946 song by Arsenio Rodríguez